The Global Initiative for Asthma (GINA) is a medical guidelines organisation which works with public health officials and health care professionals globally to reduce asthma prevalence, morbidity, and mortality. GINA was launched in 1993 as a collaboration between National Heart, Lung, and Blood Institute, National Institutes of Health, and the World Health Organization.

Work
GINA conducts continuous review of scientific publications on asthma and is a leader in disseminating information about the care of patients with asthma. GINA publishes resources such as evidence-based guidelines for asthma management, and runs special events such as World Asthma Day. GINA's guidelines, revised each year, are used by clinicians worldwide.

References

External links
 Link to the GINA asthma website

Asthma organizations
Organizations established in 1993
International medical and health organizations